Golden Valley County is a county located in the U.S. state of Montana. As of the 2020 census, the population was 823, making it the third-least populous county in Montana. Its county seat is Ryegate.

Geography
It is Montana's fifth-smallest county by area.

Major highways
  U.S. Highway 12
  Montana Highway 3

Adjacent counties

 Fergus County – north
 Musselshell County – east
 Yellowstone County – southeast
 Stillwater County – south
 Sweet Grass County – southwest
 Wheatland County – west

National protected area
 Lewis and Clark National Forest (part)

Politics
The county has usually favored Republican candidates. The 2016 Democratic candidate only received 71 county votes, the lowest ever for a major party in the county in a presidential election. The last Democrat to win there was Lyndon Johnson in his 1964 landslide victory.

Demographics

2000 census
As of the 2000 census, there were 1,042 people, 365 households, and 263 families in the county. The population density was <1/km2 (1/sq mi). There were 450 housing units at an average density of <1/km2 (<1/sq mi).  The racial makeup of the county was 99.14% White, 0.58% Native American, 0.10% Asian, and 0.19% from two or more races.  1.25% of the population were Hispanic or Latino of any race. 44.4% were of German, 11.4% American, 8.2% Norwegian and 7.7% English ancestry. 88.5% spoke English and 11.1% German as their first language.

There were 365 households, out of which 26.80% had children under the age of 18 living with them, 66.80% were married couples living together, 3.30% had a female householder with no husband present, and 27.90% were non-families. 24.40% of all households were made up of individuals, and 11.00% had someone living alone who was 65 years of age or older.  The average household size was 2.41 and the average family size was 2.85.

The county population contained 27.60% under the age of 18, 5.90% from 18 to 24, 23.00% from 25 to 44, 27.00% from 45 to 64, and 16.50% who were 65 years of age or older. The median age was 42 years. For every 100 females there were 107.20 males. For every 100 females age 18 and over, there were 103.20 males.

The median income for a household in the county was $27,308, and the median income for a family was $35,000. Males had a median income of $14,028 versus $19,063 for females. The per capita income for the county was $13,573. About 16.50% of families and 25.80% of the population were below the poverty line, including 20.40% of those under age 18 and 21.60% of those age 65 or over.

2010 census
As of the 2010 census, there were 884 people, 363 households, and 239 families residing in the county. The racial makeup of the county was 94.0% white, 1.0% American Indian, 0.7% Asian, 2.1% from other races, and 2.1% from two or more races. Those of Hispanic or Latino origin made up 3.5% of the population. In terms of ancestry, 38.9% were German, 19.5% were English, 18.4% were Irish, 10.1% were Polish, 9.0% were American, 7.3% were Danish, 6.4% were Dutch, and 6.2% were Norwegian.

Of the 363 households, 20.7% had children under the age of 18 living with them, 55.4% were married couples living together, 5.2% had a female householder with no husband present, 34.2% were non-families, and 29.5% of all households were made up of individuals. The average household size was 2.19 and the average family size was 2.68. The median age was 48.8 years.

The median income for a household in the county was $35,726 and the median income for a family was $48,750. Males had a median income of $33,750 versus $27,938 for females. The per capita income for the county was $19,319. About 3.4% of families and 10.9% of the population were below the poverty line, including 21.7% of those under age 18 and 5.8% of those age 65 or over.

Communities

Towns
 Lavina
 Ryegate (county seat)

Census-designated place
 Golden Valley Colony

Unincorporated communities

 Barber
 Belmont
 Franklin
 Lavina

See also
 List of lakes in Golden Valley County, Montana
 List of mountains in Golden Valley County, Montana
 National Register of Historic Places listings in Golden Valley County, Montana

References

External links
 Golden Valley County, Montana Website

 
1920 establishments in Montana
Populated places established in 1920